"Better Than Love" is the debut single by British musical duo Hurts from their debut album, Happiness. It was released on 23 May 2010 in the United Kingdom, where it peaked at number 50 on the UK Singles Chart. It also charted in Belgium and the Netherlands. It was originally performed by Daggers, Theo and Adam's band before Hurts.

The song was re-released as a double A-side with "lluminated" on 1 May 2011.

Music video
The music video, directed by W.I.Z, was uploaded onto Hurts' official YouTube channel on 28 April 2010, following a trailer uploaded the day before. Their first professionally made music video, it features Theo Hutchcraft and Adam Anderson in an audition hall surrounded by women dressed in similar attire to themselves. As Anderson plays piano, Hutchcraft watches the auditions in the reflection of the hall's mirror. The video was filmed in Bucharest, Romania, in Buftea studio along with Romanian actresses Laura Cosoi, Mădălina Ghiţescu and others. Cosoi also starred in the video for their later song "Sunday".

Track listings
CD single
"Better Than Love" (Radio Edit) – 3:32
"Mother Nature" – 2:50

7" vinyl
"Better Than Love" (Radio Edit) – 3:32
"Mother Nature" – 2:50

iTunes single
"Better Than Love" (Radio Edit) – 3:32
"Better Than Love" (Jamaica Remix) – 4:19

iTunes EP
"Better Than Love" (Radio Edit) – 3:32
"Better Than Love" (Tiefschwarz Mix) – 8:48

German iTunes EP
"Better Than Love" (Album Version) - 3:33
"Better Than Love" (Live & Unplugged From BBC Radio 1's Live Lounge)
"Better Than Love" (Tiefschwarz Remix) - 8:48
"Better Than Love" (Burns European Sex Remix) - 5:06
"Better Than Love" (Freemasons Pegasus Mix [Radio Edit]) - 3:36
"Better Than Love" (Jamaica Remix) - 4:19
"Better Than Love" (Death in Vegas Acid Remix) – 8:14

Italian CD single/12" vinyl
"Better Than Love" – 3:32
"Better Than Love" (Italoconnection Remix) – 5:14

Personnel
Hurts – lyrics, music, production
Joseph Cross – music, production
Jonas Quant – production
Spike Stent – mixing

Source:

Charts

References

External links

2010 singles
Hurts songs
2010 songs
RCA Records singles
Songs written by Theo Hutchcraft